Londonderry Township is a township in Chester County, Pennsylvania, United States. The population was 2,149 at the 2010 census.

History
In 1682, William Penn deeded 50,000 acres in what is now Londonderry Township to his relative John Fagg. It eventually developed into the crossroads community of Faggs Manor, Pennsylvania. Londonderry Township was officially created in 1734 when its Scotch-Irish immigrant residents voted to secede from Nottingham Township. It is named after the city of Londonderry, Ireland which is in present-day Northern Ireland.

The township was profiled in Witold Rybczynski's 2007 book Last Harvest: How a Cornfield Became New Daleville. He divided the population into four types: farmers, who made up only 10 percent of the population; large wealthy landowners, who make up another 10 percent and often raise horses; old suburbanites; and new suburbanites. The old suburbanites and new suburbanites have little in common but both oppose new development in the township.

The John Ferron House, Moses Ross House, and St. Malachi Church are listed on the National Register of Historic Places.

Geography

Demographics

At the 2010 census, the township was 91.1% non-Hispanic White, 1.0% Black or African American, 0.8% Asian, and 1.0% were two or more races. 6.2% of the population were of Hispanic or Latino ancestry.

As of the census of 2000, there were 1,632 people, 525 households, and 410 families living in the township.  The population density was 144.0 people per square mile (55.6/km2).  There were 539 housing units at an average density of 47.6/sq mi (18.4/km2).  The racial makeup of the township was 95.53% White, 1.23% African American, 0.55% Asian, 2.27% from other races, and 0.43% from two or more races. Hispanic or Latino of any race were 9.31% of the population.

There were 525 households, out of which 37.5% had children under the age of 18 living with them, 65.7% were married couples living together, 8.6% had a female householder with no husband present, and 21.9% were non-families. 18.1% of all households were made up of individuals, and 6.1% had someone living alone who was 65 years of age or older.  The average household size was 2.91 and the average family size was 3.33.

In the township the population was spread out, with 28.2% under the age of 18, 6.2% from 18 to 24, 31.5% from 25 to 44, 26.4% from 45 to 64, and 7.7% who were 65 years of age or older.  The median age was 37 years. For every 100 females there were 106.3 males.  For every 100 females age 18 and over, there were 109.5 males.

The median income for a household in the township was $54,750, and the median income for a family was $59,911. Males had a median income of $31,618 versus $31,413 for females. The per capita income for the township was $21,773.  About 6.4% of families and 8.2% of the population were below the poverty line, including 12.1% of those under age 18 and 10.9% of those age 65 or over.

Transportation

Pennsylvania Route 41, Pennsylvania Route 796 and Pennsylvania Route 926 are the numbered highways serving Londonderry Township. PA 41 follows Gap Newport Pike along a northwest-southeast alignment through the central portion of the township. PA 796 heads south from PA 41 along Jennersville Road through the southern portion of the township. Finally, PA 926 follows Street Road along a southwest-northeast alignment through the southern and central portions of the township.

Notes

References

External links
Londonderry Township

Scotch-Irish American culture in Pennsylvania
Scotch-Irish American history
Townships in Chester County, Pennsylvania